Soyons Libres (SL), also called Libres, (English: Let's be free), is a French political party that was founded in 2017 by Valérie Pécresse, within The Republicans.

Politicians 

 Florence Berthout
Jean-Carles Grelier
 Patrick Karam
 Frédérique Meunier
 Florence Portelli
Robin Reda

References

External links 

 Official website

Political parties established in 2017
2017 establishments in France
Pro-European political parties in France
Conservative parties in France